Ayeyawady United Football Club is a Burmese football club, based at Pathein Stadium in Pathein, Myanmar. The club was a founding member of the Myanmar National League (MNL) in 2009, and represents the Ayeyarwady Division in lower Myanmar. The club finished tied for the last place in the league's inaugural cup competition, the MNL Cup 2009. The club owners of Delta United have changed four times. Currently, a total of 26 entrepreneurs from Ayeyawady Region are successfully running the club. Ayeyawady United Football Club is the first ever Runner-up team in Myanmar National League with an unbeaten record for 25 matches. This record was broken by the match against with Zeyarshwe Myay F.C.

In 2011, Delta United was renamed as Ayeyawady United.

2023 Final Squad

Continental record

Achievements
2009-10 Myanmar National League : Runners-up ( U San Win / Head Coach )
2011 Myanmar National League : Runners-up ( Mr. Jozef Heral / Head Coach )
2012 Charity Cup Myanmar Super Cup 2012 : Champions ( Mr. Jozef Heral / Head Coach )
Ooredoo Cup MFF Digicel Cup 2012 Myanmar National Cup 2012: Champions ( Mr. Marjan Sekulovski / Head Coach )
2013 Charity Cup Myanmar Super Cup 2013: Runners-up ( Mr. Marjan Sekulovski / Head Coach )
Ooredoo Cup Myanmar National Cup 2014: Champions ( U San Win / Head Coach )
2015 Charity Cup Myanmar Super Cup 2015: Champions ( Mr. Marjan Sekulovski / Head Coach )
2015 General Aung San Shield Myanmar National Cup 2015: Champions ( Mr. Marjan Sekulovski / Head Coach )
'''AFC Cup :Round of 16:2015

League and domestic cup history

Sponsorship

References

External links
 Ayeyawady United FC
 
 First Eleven Journal in Burmese
 Soccer Myanmar in Burmese
 Delta Utdta United FC

Association football clubs established in 2009
Myanmar National League clubs
2009 establishments in Myanmar
Football clubs in Myanmar